Franziska Maria "Ska" Keller (born 22 November 1981) is a German politician and member of the European Parliament for the Germany constituency. She is a member of the Alliance 90/The Greens, part of the European Green Party.

She is co-president of the Greens/EFA group in the European Parliament and member of the Committee on Fisheries (PECH) as well as the Committee on the Environment, Public Health and Food Safety (ENVI). Ska Keller was the European Greens' frontrunner during the European elections 2014 together with José Bové and has been elected to lead them again for the European elections 2019, together with Dutchman Bas Eickhout. She is currently serving her third term in office (2019–2024), while she was first elected into the European Parliament at the age of 27 in 2009.

Education
Keller studied Islamic studies, Turkish and Jewish Studies at Free University of Berlin and at Sabancı University in Istanbul. Besides her native language of German, she is also fluent in English, French and Spanish, as well as speaking some Turkish and Arabic. She completed her degree in 2010.

Political career

Early beginnings
In 2001, Keller joined the Green Youth and served as spokesperson of the Federation of Young European Greens from 2005 to 2007. From 2007 to 2009, she led the Green Party in Brandenburg having joined the German Green party in 2002. In Brandenburg, she campaigned for a statewide referendum against new coal mines.

Member of the European Parliament, 2009–present
During her first term (2009–2014), Keller served on the Committee on Development from 2009 to 2012. From 2012 to 2014, she was a member of the Committee on International Trade. In addition to her committee assignments, Keller was also member of the Parliament's delegation with the EU-Turkey Joint Parliamentary Committee. In this capacity, she focused on the issues of migration and the EU's relations with Turkey.

In her second term (2014–2019), Keller became co-president of the Greens/EFA group in the European Parliament in 2016. Additionally, Keller was a member of the Committee on International Trade from 2014 to 2017. She continued to serve as a member of the Delegation to the EU-Turkey Joint Parliamentary Committee and joined the Parliament's delegation to the Cariforum.

From 2009 to 2011, Keller also served as member of the European Parliament's High-Level Contact Group for Relations with the Turkish Cypriot Community in the Northern Part of the Island (CYTR).

Ska Keller has been a leading candidate of the European Green Party for the European elections in 2014 as well as in 2019. In January 2014, Keller won the Green Primary, a pan-European open primary. On 24 November 2018, Keller was elected leading candidate for the second time, together with Bas Eickhout.

In July 2019, Keller announced she would be a candidate for the presidency of the European Parliament. Sira Rigo of the GUE/NGL, David-Maria Sassoli of the S&D and Jan Zahradil of the ECR also ran for the post, with Sassoli eventually winning with the support of 345 out of a total of 667 MEPs.

In September 2022, Keller announced her resignation as co-chair of her party's group and her decision not to run again in the 2024 elections.

Other activities
 Institut Solidarische Moderne (ISM), Member (since 2010)

Political positions
Keller is known for her commitment to fighting corruption in the European Union. In February 2018, she participated in protests in Sofia against corruption in Bulgaria.

In September 2019, European Commission President-elect Ursula von der Leyen created the new position of "Vice President for Protecting our European Way of Life", who will be responsible for upholding the rule-of-law, internal security and migration. Keller said it was "scary to see a proposal for a portfolio on 'protecting the European way of life' which includes migration and border protection."

Personal life
Keller is married to Finnish politician .

She abbreviated her first name from Franziska to Ska by omitting the first part ('Franzi-').

References

External links

 Homepage of Ska Keller 

1981 births
Living people
People from Guben
Alliance 90/The Greens MEPs
MEPs for Germany 2009–2014
MEPs for Germany 2014–2019
MEPs for Germany 2019–2024
21st-century women MEPs for Germany